Vedham is a 2001 Indian Tamil-language romantic drama film written, produced, and directed by Arjun. The film stars himself, Sakshi, Vineeth, and Divya Unni, while Mumtaj, Goundamani, and Senthil play important roles. The music was composed by Vidyasagar. The film released on 24 August 2001 and was critically acclaimed.

Actor Vishal worked as one of the assistant directors in the film.

Plot
Sanjay and Anitha are a married couple living in Coimbatore but are on the verge of getting divorced. Vijay, a friend of Sanjay, understands the situation and decides to patch them together. Vijay travels to Sanjay's home and stays with the couple for a few weeks. During their conversations, Vijay keeps describing about his wife Seetha, two kids, and his joyful marriage life. Slowly, Sanjay and Anitha understand each other and want to lead a happy life similar to Vijay and Seetha. Finally, it is revealed that all the stories told by Vijay are just his imagination so that it would inspire Sanjay and Anitha. The truth is that Vijay was in love with Seetha, but she accidentally died before their wedding and Vijay lives her memories. However, he ensures that Sanjay and Anitha do not get to know the truth. In the end, Sanjay and Anitha are united. Vijay leaves to his home in Chennai with the satisfaction of solving Sanjay's problems.

Cast
Arjun as Vijay
Sakshi Shivanand as Seetha 
Vineeth as Sanjay
Divya Unni as Anitha Sanjay 
Mumtaj as Pooja
Goundamani as Govindsamy
Senthil
Mayilsamy
Chinni Jayanth
Vennira Aadai Moorthy
 Sridhar as dancer

Soundtrack

The soundtrack was composed by Vidyasagar. The song "Malai Kaatru" was reused from the composer's own Malayalam song "Oru Raathri Koodi", which appeared in the Malayalam film Summer in Bethlehem. Lyrics written by Vairamuthu and Pa. Vijay.

Reception
Sify wrote, "Action King Arjun's maiden directorial Vedham is sleep inducing. Arjun should stick to patriotism, guns and scantly clad girls dancing in ribaldry. But here he wants to experiment with the idea – “To be in love for ever” but ends up making an insufferable film that leaves you with a migraine'. The Hindu wrote, "Generally it is patriotism that is the underlying theme of Arjun's films. But in Vedham he deviates much, to talk about the sanctity of the institution of marriage and glorify the familial unit. The message is loud and clear - so clear that it turns didactic".

References

External links

2001 films
2000s Tamil-language films
Films directed by Arjun Sarja
Films scored by Vidyasagar